Nimgaon (H) is a village in the Karmala taluka of Solapur district in Maharashtra state, India.

Demographics
Covering  and comprising 219 households at the time of the 2011 census of India, Nimgaon (H) had a population of 1043. There were 559 males and 484 females, with 122 people being aged six or younger.

References

Villages in Karmala taluka